The 2015–16 Xavier Musketeers men's basketball team represented Xavier University during the 2015–16 NCAA Division I men's basketball season. Led by seventh year head coach Chris Mack, they played their games at the Cintas Center and were third year members of the Big East Conference. They finished the season 28–6, 14–4 in Big East play to finish in second place. They defeated Marquette in the quarterfinals of the Big East tournament to advance to the semifinals where they lost to Seton Hall. They received an at-large bid to the NCAA tournament where they received a #2 seed. They defeated Weber State in the First Round to advance to the Second Round where they lost to Wisconsin.

Previous season
The Musketeers finished the 2014–15 season 23–14, 9–9 in Big East play to finish in sixth place. They advanced to the finals of the Big East tournament where they lost to Villanova. They received an at-large bid to the NCAA tournament where they defeated Ole Miss and Georgia State before losing to Arizona in the Sweet Sixteen.

Departures

Incoming recruits

Roster

Schedule

|-
!colspan=9 style="background:#062252; color:#FFFFFF;"| Exhibition

|-
!colspan=9 style="background:#062252; color:#FFFFFF;"| Non-Conference Regular season

|-
!colspan=9 style="background:#; color:#;"|Big East regular season

|-
!colspan=9 style="background:#062252; color:#FFFFFF;"| Big East tournament

|-
!colspan=9 style="background:#062252; color:#FFFFFF;"| NCAA tournament

Rankings

*AP does not release post-NCAA tournament rankings

References

Xavier Musketeers men's basketball seasons
Xavier
Xavier